Necaise (also known as Necaise Crossing) is an unincorporated community in Hancock County, Mississippi, United States.

Necaise is the birthplace of professional basketball player Wendell Ladner.

References

Unincorporated communities in Hancock County, Mississippi
Unincorporated communities in Mississippi